Charlélie Couture (born Bertrand Charles Elie Couture, 26 February 1956) is a French & American musician and multi-disciplinary artist, who has recorded over 25 albums and 17 film soundtracks, and has held a number of exhibitions of paintings and photographs. He has also worked as a poster designer, and has published about 15 books of reflections, drawings and photographs.

Life and career
He was born in Nancy, and graduated from l'École nationale supérieure des Beaux-Arts. He released his first album, 12 Chansons dans la Sciure ("12 Songs in the Sawdust") in 1978, followed by Le Pêcheur ("The Fisherman") in 1979 and Pochette surprise ("Lucky Dip") in 1981. He was then signed by Chris Blackwell to Island Records, becoming the first French artist on the label. He recorded the album Poèmes Rock in New York, and also contributed a track to the album A Christmas Record issued by ZE Records, an affiliate of the Island label. He had a hit single in France with the track Comme un Avion Sans Aile.

Also in 1981, he founded, in Nancy, the Local à Louer group of photographers, painters, poets, and stated in his "Art Rock manifesto" that "Art must make the junction between the functionalism of industrial society and the aspirations of pop culture". He also launched an art journal, Le Télégramme. In 1983, he wrote his first complete film soundtrack, for the movie Tchao Pantin ("So Long, Stooge"), for which he was nominated for a César Award. He held his first exhibition of drawings and watercolours in Paris in 1985, and continued to record and tour. In 1990–91 he visited Australia, recording two albums there, Melbourne Aussie and Victoria Spirit.

Later in the 1990s, his recordings were less successful and he concentrated more on photography, drawings and paintings. In 1997 he recorded a blues-influenced album, Casque Nu ("Naked Helmet"), in Chicago. In 1998, he was awarded the title of Officier du Mérite National. He worked extensively preparing posters and publicity for tennis tournaments, including the posters for the 2002 Davis Cup Final between France and Russia. In 2004, he settled for several years in New York, from where he released two albums, Double Vue (2004) and New Yor-Cœur (2006).

In April 2020 he announced that he had tested positive for COVID-19.

Discography
Studio albums
1978: 12 chansons dans la sciure
1979: Le Pêcheur
1981: Pochette surprise
1981: Poèmes rock
1982: Quoi faire?
1983: Crocodile Point
1985: Art & Scalp
1987: Solo Boys
1988: Solo Girls
1990: Melbourne Aussie
1991: Victoria Spirit
1994: Les Naïves
1997: Casque nu
1999: Soudé soudés
2001: 109 (Poèmes électro)
2004: Double vue
2006: New YorCœur
2011: Fort rêveur
2014: I m M o r t e l
2016: Lafayette
2019: Même pas sommeil
2020: Trésors cachés et perles rares
Collaborative albums
1995: Dawn Town Project (with Mike Rimbaud)

Live albums
1989: 3 Folies Live (recorded at Folies Bergères during Solo Boys and Girls tour)
1993: Souvenirs Live (recorded during 1991/1992 tour)

Soundtracks
1983: Tchao Pantin
1989: La Salle de bain

Compilation albums
1990: Sides of Me
1991: Island Colors
1996: Patchworks

Summary of Artistic Creations
www.theregallery-nyc.com
www.meetcharlelie.com

Education and conferences
1973 – Lives home and goes on the road for one year
1974 – Graduates " Art Baccalauréat " from outside the higt school system.
1979 – Graduates with honors from the Beaux-Arts DNSEP
Jury for many conventions and festivals among them American film Deauville)
2000 – Conference to the Commission Europeenne about Art and Culture
2004 – Conference " Conversations Essentielles " " " Faith %26 Culture " Paris
2007 – Beaubourg Art Pocket Film, 2006, Québec Festival 1998 etc...
2008 – Conference " Conventions Essentielles "  Music and Creation, Paris
2011 – Conference "  The Multism ", New York and Lecture  " Discourse about The Multism ". La Sorbonne / Paris

Solo Exhibitions

2012: Sept-installation "Manhattan" a project with 100 wood sculptures, France 
2012: Big Panel Photo-graff- Paris LCL
2012: CharlElie Black Art curated by Nomade monade- Lille Artfair
2011: "Re-Construction"  Dune Showroom, New York, USA
2011: "Peintures et Photografs" Galerie Naclil, Lille France
2011: Salon d'Art contemporain Strasbourg, Galerie Nomade Monade France
2011: Salon d'Art contemporain Metz, A'del Gallery, Lyon France
2011: "New York Be" Galerie W Paris France
2011: AAA Galerie, Nogent sur Marne France
2011: Salon Balt'Art, Nogent sur Marne France
2011: Permanente exhibition, The Re Gallery, New York, USA
2010: "Drawings and photografs " Galerie Antonio Nardonne, Brussels, Belgium
2010: "New York on lines " Galery A.del, Lyon, Biennale de la photographie
2009: "New York, Photo-Grafs", Galerie Beaudoin Lebon, Paris 
2009: "Shower Curtain and Photos" Maison Française/Washington
2009: "Photos New York" "Mosaïque de Photo" La Collégiale Saint-André/Chartres Curated by Nadine Berthelier Directeur des Arts et du Patrimoine culturel et historique, Conservateur en Chef du Patrimoine
2008: "Re Construction Paintings and Photos", Crid'Art, Amneville, France
2008: "Art Floor" Photos, Galerie Agnes Martel, Switzerland
2007: "Re Construction", Galerie Mourlot, New York (USA)
2007: Galerie Ô, Vevey (Switzerland)" New York Shields %26 Paintings"
2005: "Living with Art", Soho, New York (USA)
2005: Opens his Art Studio in the Garment district
2004: Gallery Art at Home, Soho, New York 
2004: Art Basel Miami – French Tuesday Art Night  
2004: Move to New York.
2004: Galerie Sparts, rue de Seine Paris
2004: Galerie Wable, Lille France
2003: Laval Museum (France) Retrospective Exhibit on CharlElie's "L'art Total"
2003: Gallery Ô, Pozzo Di Borgo Vevey (Switzerland)
2003: Gallery SOTO Brussels (Belgium)
2002: Museum Le Corbusier – La Chaux de Fond (Switzerland)
2001: Galerie Capazza Nancay, inaugurates a new wing of his huge Gallery.
2000: Clermont Ferrand, Galerie Gastaud
2000: Lyon, Galerie Chomarat (paintings and drawings)
2000: Gallery Wable, Lille and Boulogne sur Mer
1999: Museum of Erotism – Paris "X Positions" (photos, paintings)
1999: Publicis/Champs Elysees (Tennis drawings)
1998: Gallery Akka, rue de Seine, Paris, France
1997: Fondation Nationale de la Photo, Lyon France (Photo-poems)
1997: Retrospective of "Chambres d'hotels Polaroids" Château Lumière, Lyon / France 
1997: Drawings and paintings et the Galerie Wable in Boulogne sur Mer
1995: Avignon France Cloitre des Arts (Sculptures and drawings)
1995: Galerie Gastaud, Clermont Ferrand France
1994: Galerie Ziggourat, Brussel (Belgium) "Chambres d'hotel"
1993: "Chambres d'hotels" drawings, in Geneva, Galerie Papiers gras
1993: "Chambres d'hotels", drawings paintings, Galerie Nachbaur, Paris
1991: Galerie Atsuro Tayama (Paris) France
1991: Australian paintings and photopoems, Galerie Jean D'eve, Neuchatel (Switzerland)
1989: Exhibit Multimedia engravings/sculptures/paintings/musics/drawings/photos/texts
1989: Galerie " Halle Sud " of Geneva
1985: First exhibit in Paris, drawings and watercolors of "Chambres d'hotels", Galerie Du Jour/Agnès B
1971: First painting and photo exhibit

Various
2010: Poster for "Le Palais Ideal du Facteur Cheval"
2006–2009: Creates posters for FFT, and tennis tournaments
2003: Creation of poster for the Davis Cup Final (France-Russia)
2001: Participation in the creation of the "Livre de Roland Garros 2001" – set of photos of the greatest photographers – William Klein, texts by Patrice Dominguez and drawings by Charlelie
1995: Designing the sets and costumes for the show "Concert Naïf au pays des Anges" at the Théâtre National de L'Odéon
1995: Bézier Museum exhibits a work on cardboard entitled "Knoxville USA"
1995: Creation a fresco for the opening of the FNAC in Nancy
1995: Creation of CD ROM "Papers works", exhibit in Metz
1994: Creation of fans for the galerie La Pochade, Paris France
1994: Conception and drawing of the new Logo for the Lorraine Region
1993: Inauguration FNAC in Avignon, " Photos d'hotels ", traveling exhibit in France
1988: Actor and song writer for the film "The Moderns" (USA) by Alan Rudolph
1983: Nomination to the Cesar show for his soundtrack of Claude Berri film Tchao Pantin
1982: Editor of the performing arts newspaper the Telegramme

Group Exhibitions
2011: Exhibitions "Mail Art" drawings – SpArtS Gallery Paris
2010: Exhibitions, Art for a Better World, Miami, FL, Artbasel
2010: Street Artak street Art Festival, Angers
2010: "New York by" Galerie W, Paris devoted to L'Angelus, Barbizon, 100 artists salute Millet	
2009: Group show/FACEBOOK'S FRIENDS a virtual reality /Curator Michael Picoron
2008: Temple Emmanu-El of Closter, Brooklyn
2008: "Shower Curtains" ACMDM, centre d'Art Contemporain in Perpignan, France
2007: New York Art Floor with Peter Klasen (Photos) Metz (France)
2006: "Crossings" at Living with Art NYC Soho.  (With Thurman & Pascal)
2003: "Sport Tools" for an Art Exhibition during the Olympic Games of Athens 2004
2000: International Art Market in Strasbourg
1999: Creates a watch-box for Swatch / Paris Place Vendôme
1997: Eurexpo show, Geneva, Switzerland
1981–1986: Founder of an artists group called "Local a Louer" including painters, poets, graphic artists and photographers publishing of the " Manifeste de l'Art Rock " Numbers of exhibitions Paris, Tours Lille, Nancy
1978: Salon des artistes indépendants Paris

Publications
2012: " Et avant" (And Before) CharlElie (author), Serge Bloch (illustrator)
2011: "New York Be" Publisher Editions du Chêne, book, Photography
2009: "New York by CharlElie " Publisher Editions du Chêne, book, Photography
2009: Manhattan Photo-grafs Special Edition Book, L&N Editions
2004: Artistic Travel notebook "En Australie", publisher Presse de la Renaissance
2000: Creation of posters for Jean Pierre Cassel performance, and for various sports tournaments in ad abroad France (Tunisia)
1999: "Beaux Gestes ", Tennis Drawings Pré aux Clercs Editions
1999: "Transfocus" digital photographs accompanied by a CD Rom with original recordings FNAC Publishing
1998: "Le couloir des brumes", Novel Pré aux Clercs Editions 
1998: "Filles de jour" Marval Éditions, Illustrations and texts in parallel with the photographs of Martial Lorcet
1996: "Les Champs Paraboliques" on line. First version of the Web site CharlElie.com (Charlelie is one of the pioneer of the art web-site)
1995: Book of poetical reflections " Inventaire Paradoxal des petits plaisirs et de grandes haines " Stock Editions
1995: "25 images secondes" Illustrations for a novel by Hervé Eparvier, Serpent à Plume Editions
1992: Book of drawings "Jimmy Jacket"  Art Editions, R Meier	
1992: Book of photographs "Do not disturb", Marval Editions Plume
1989: "Les dragons en Sucre" Novel – Ramsay Pauvert Editions
1989: "Solo Boys and Girls", a collection of songs texts with original photographs and drawings Seghers Editions 
1984: Collection of drawings entitled " Cahiers d'Ecoles " reproduced on " alugraphie " paper though the art publisher, Voix R Meier

Selected articles and reviews
"Les chemins parallèles", first book written by Alain Gilson about his multi-work. Published by Pierre-Marcel Favre –Switzerland 1988.

Selected catalogues
2010: "Follow the Line" Publisher RentingArt, reflexion about CharlElie's art prospective
2007: "New York" Ô Quai des Arts Galerie, Vevey Zwitzerland
2007: "Re Constructions" Galerie Moulot, New York, USA
2007: "30 années de regard" Galerie Capazza, Nancay, France
2006: "Atelier Newyorcoeur ", Presse Litteraires, France
1993: "Chambres d'Hotel" Galerie Nachbaur, Paris France
1992: "Australian Roadbook " Galerie J Lovera (France)

Awards
2010: Chevalier des Arts et lettres
2003: Chevalier de la Légion d'honneur, given by Mr Stephane Hessel
2001: Roland Garros 2001 collection is awarded the Lacoste prize
1999: Lacoste Prize for the best drawings sports book of the year Beaux Gestes
1998: Officier du Mérite National awarded by the Minister of the Cultural Affairs 
1989: Academy Charles Cross Award
1978: Quintard Prize from Academy Stanislas for the quality of his Art studies
1976: Second prize for Young Photojournalist from the city of Nancy.

References

External links
  Official site (mostly in French)
  Charlélie Couture art works

Living people
1956 births
French male singers
French songwriters
20th-century French painters
French male painters
21st-century French painters
French photographers
French poster artists
Musicians from Nancy, France